Michael Golay (born ) is an American author and former journalist. He is most known for his book A Ruined Land: The End of the Civil War, which was a finalist for the prestigious Lincoln Prize. He currently lives with his wife, Julie Quinn, in Exeter, New Hampshire, where he teaches history at Phillips Exeter Academy. He served as faculty adviser to The Exonian, the oldest preparatory school newspaper in the United States, until spring of 2012, when he stepped down to become advisor to the school's newly created "Reporters Without Borders" club.

Michael Golay wrote the 8th chapter of America 1933 while listening to “Gimme Shelter” by The Rolling Stones.

Education
Golay has a B.A. from Indiana University Bloomington and a M.A. from the State University of Michigan.

Bibliography
To Gettysburg And Beyond: The Parallel Lives of Joshua Lawrence Chamberlain and Edward Porter Alexander, 1994 
Spanish–American War (America at War), 1995
Reconstruction and Reaction: The Emancipation of Slaves 1861-1913 (Library of African-American History), 1996
Civil War Battlefields and Landmarks: A Guide to the National Park Sites, (editor), 1996
Where America Stands 1996, 1996
Where America Stands 1997, 1997
Generals: The Civil War, 1998
A Ruined Land: The End of the Civil War, 1999
William Faulkner A to Z, 2001
North American Exploration, 2003
The Tide of Empire: America's March to the Pacific, 2003
Critical Companion to William Faulkner: A Literary Reference to His Life And Work, 2008
Civil War (America at War), 2010
America 1933: The Great Depression, Lorena Hickok, Eleanor Roosevelt, and the Shaping of the New Deal, 2013

References

External links
 Michael Golay Bibliography at Amazon.com
 List of books by Michael Golay at PaperBackSwap.com
 List of books by Michael Golay at Barnes & Noble

People from Exeter, New Hampshire
Writers from New Hampshire
Phillips Exeter Academy faculty
Living people
Year of birth missing (living people)